Babol Kenar Rural District is a rural district (dehestan) in Babol Kenar District, Babol County, Mazandaran Province, Iran. At the 2006 census, its population was 16,990, in 4,491 families. The rural district has 26 villages.

References 

Rural Districts of Mazandaran Province
Babol County